Tiny House Nation is an American reality television series. The series premiered on July 9, 2014, on the FYI network. After the fourth season, the series began airing on FYI's parent network: A&E. The second half of season 5 was burned off with a 9AM timeslot on Saturdays.

Tiny House Nation began streaming on Netflix in August 2019.

As of late November 2020, National Geographic began airing “Tiny House Nation” in syndication.

Episodes

Season 1 (2014)

Season 2 (2014-15)

Season 3 (2016)

Season 4 (2017)

Season 5 (2019)

See also

References

External links 
 

2010s American reality television series
2014 American television series debuts
2019 American television series endings
English-language television shows
Home renovation television series
FYI (American TV channel) original programming
A&E (TV network) original programming